This article presents the discography of American country music singer-songwriter, Donna Fargo. Since 1972, Fargo has released 15 studio albums, one of which was certified Gold by the RIAA. She has also released 47 singles, 6 of which went to Number One on the Billboard Hot Country Singles chart.

Studio albums

1970s

1980s

Compilation albums

Singles

1960s — 1970s

1980s — 2000s

Notes

A^ Just for You also peaked at number 9 on the Canadian RPM Country Albums/CD's chart.

References 

Country music discographies
Discographies of American artists